Modern pentathlon events have been contested since the first Pan American Games in 1951, in every edition except between 1967 and 1983, and 1991 and 1995.

Events

Medal table

Last updated after the 2019 Pan American Games

References 

Sports123

 
Pan American Games
Sports at the Pan American Games
Pan American Games
Pan American Games